"High Horse" is a song written by Jimmy Ibbotson, and recorded by American country music group Nitty Gritty Dirt Band.  It was released in January 1985 as the third single from the album Plain Dirt Fashion and reached number 2 on the Billboard Hot Country Singles & Tracks chart.

Charts

Weekly charts

Year-end charts

References

1985 singles
1984 songs
Nitty Gritty Dirt Band songs
Song recordings produced by Paul Worley
Warner Records singles
Songs written by Jimmy Ibbotson